The Istanbul suburban railway, locally referred to as B1, was an important rail line in İstanbul, Turkey. It was operated by the Turkish State Railways and was one of Istanbul's two commuter rail lines (the other being the Haydarpaşa suburban). Carrying an average of 22,200 passengers daily, it was the second-busiest commuter railway in Turkey, after the Haydarpaşa suburban.

The İstanbul Commuter Railway is a historical line, being the first rail line to be electrified and being the first commuter railway in Turkey. Since it opened on December 4, 1955, the E8000 series have been in operation. In the 1970s, the E14000 series came into service and in 2010 the new EUROTEM built E23000 series began service.  The line was closed in 2014 and all tracks have been removed for renovation and incorporation into the new Marmaray network which started operation in 2013 between Ayrılıkçeşmesi and Kazlıçeşme.

The eastern terminus is Sirkeci Terminal in the Fatih district in the historical city center. The line curves around the shore of the Eminönü peninsula, below the historic Topkapı Palace, and heads west. Travelling on the southern European shore of Istanbul, the line passes through several important districts, until curving north at Soğuksu to Halkalı.

Stations

History

The line was originally built by the Oriental Railway (CO) in 1872, as a part of their İstanbul–Vienna main line. The railway started to operate trains, when the line reached Edirne in 1873. The CO was absorbed by the Turkish State Railways (TCDD) in 1937 and TCDD started to operate steam-powered commuter service on the line. 

The line was electrified in 25 kV AC in 1955. 25 kV AC electrification technology was quite new at the time, following the 1953 experiments in France and it made TCDD at the forefront in a suburb, seashore environment. 

This electrification enabled a frequent commuter service with E8000 EMUs.  TCDD took also delivery of  three E4000 electric locomotives for hauled trains.  In the 1970s, new E14000 EMUs started to appear on the line and in the 1990s, the E4000 locomotives were retired. New E23000 EMUs were put into service on September 19, 2010. With the addition of the new EMUs, the E8000s were finally retired.

In 2003, the Marmaray project started construction of a tunnel underneath the Bosphorus, as well as the upgrade to this line. Plans were finalized, and the line closed on June 19, 2013 for at least 2 years. Part of it has been replaced by the underground Marmaray line though: the Kazlıçeşme station was replaced with a new surface station somewhat closer to central Istanbul, the Yenikapı station has been replaced with an underground station, and the stations Yedikule, Kocamustafapaşa, Kumkapı and Cankurtaran have been permanently closed. A new underground station has been built in Sirkeci from where the tunnel under the Bosphorous runs. The surface station in Sirkeci can be the final station for future long distance trains. Currently, no such trains can arrive there because the track has been torn up and removed between the stations Kazlıçeşme and Halkalı. The planned reopening in June 2015 between these stations has been delayed tough, reopening should take place in the first months of 2019.

References

See also 
Istanbul–Pythio railway to which this Istanbul suburb railway belongs

Railway lines in Turkey
Closed railway lines in Turkey
Rapid transit in Turkey
Standard gauge railways in Turkey
Rail transport in Istanbul